Calamovilfa is a genus of North American plants in the grass family native to the United States and Canada.

 Species
 Calamovilfa arcuata K.E.Rogers - OK AL AR TN GA KY
 Calamovilfa brevipilis (Torr.) Scribn. - NJ NC SCA VA
 Calamovilfa curtissii (Vasey) Scribn. - Florida
 Calamovilfa gigantea (Nutt.) Scribn. & Merr. - COL KS NE OK AZ UT NM TX 
 Calamovilfa longifolia (Hook.) Scribn. - ABT BRC MAN SAS ONT COL ID MT WA WY IL IA KS MN MO ND NE SD WI IN MI NY OH PA NM

 formerly included
see Cinna 
 Calamovilfa poiformis - syn of  Cinna poiformis

See also 
 List of Poaceae genera

References

 
Poaceae genera
Taxa named by Eduard Hackel